Magnolia wilsonii, or Wilson's magnolia, is a species of Magnolia native to China, in the provinces of western Guizhou, Sichuan and northern Yunnan, where it grows in the forest understory at altitudes of 1,900-3,000 m, rarely up to 3,300 m.

Description
The leaves are elliptic to lanceolate, 6–16 cm long and 3–7 cm broad with a 1–3 cm petiole, and have brown pubescence on the underside. The flowers are drooping, 8–12 cm in diameter, with nine (occasionally 12) tepals, the outer three small and greenish, sepal-like, the main six larger and pure white; the stamens and carpels are crimson. Due to their drooping character, the flowers are best viewed from the underside.

This species is threatened by habitat destruction and collection for medicinal use (see Houpu magnolia), and regeneration is poor.

Cultivation
Magnolia wilsonii, though rare, is in cultivation as an ornamental tree and planted in temperate climate gardens, such as in coastal California. It needs a protected planting location with afternoon shade. This plant has gained the Royal Horticultural Society's Award of Garden Merit.

References

External links
Flora of China: Magnoliaceae (draft account)
Photos of flowers and fruit

wilsonii
Endemic flora of China
Flora of Guizhou
Flora of Sichuan
Flora of Yunnan
Trees of China
Garden plants of Asia
Ornamental trees